Staphylea pinnata, the European bladdernut, is a species of bladdernut native to Europe and naturalized in Britain.

Description
The species name pinnata refers to the pinnate leaves. The flowers are bisexual and pollinated by flies. The seeds are edible, and are said to taste like pistachios.

Cultivation
Staphylea pinnata can be grown in full sun to partial shade, and tolerates a variety of soils. It is hardy in zones 6–8. It has low drought tolerance.

References

Staphyleaceae
Shrubs
Flora of Europe
Edible nuts and seeds
Taxa named by Carl Linnaeus